Genie Gurnani (commonly known as simply Genie) is an American drag performer who competed on the second season of Drag Race Thailand.

Early life
Genie was born in the U.S. state of California.

Career
Genie was the first American to compete on Drag Race Thailand. According to Gay Times, she was the first North American, the first Hindu, and the first contestant of Indian descent to compete on Drag Race. In 2019, she participated in the "All Around the World: International Drag Queens" panel at RuPaul's DragCon NYC. Gurnani became executive creative director for the Americas region of Virtue, a Vice Media-owned creative agency, in 2020. Prior to that, they were appointed to lead creative for Vice Media Asia-Pacific in 2019.

Filmography

Television
 Drag Race Thailand (season 2)

Content 

 Finding Family in Bangkok's Rising Drag Scene
 Genie: Transformations with James St. James 531

Music videos

References

External links
 

Living people
American drag queens
American Hindus
American people of Indian descent
Drag Race Thailand contestants
People from California
Year of birth missing (living people)